Hugo Gittens (born 24 September 1936) is a weightlifter from Trinidad and Tobago. He represented the country at the 1964 Summer Olympics and the 1968 Summer Olympics. Additionally, Gittens won a gold medal at the 1966 Commonwealth Games and placed fourth in the 1970 Commonwealth Games in the 67.5 kg combined men's weightlighting event.

References

External links
 

1936 births
Living people
Trinidad and Tobago male weightlifters
Olympic weightlifters of Trinidad and Tobago
Weightlifters at the 1964 Summer Olympics
Weightlifters at the 1968 Summer Olympics
People from Morvant
Commonwealth Games medallists in weightlifting
Commonwealth Games gold medallists for Trinidad and Tobago
Pan American Games medalists in weightlifting
Pan American Games silver medalists for Trinidad and Tobago
Weightlifters at the 1963 Pan American Games
Weightlifters at the 1966 British Empire and Commonwealth Games
Medallists at the 1966 British Empire and Commonwealth Games